Energy secretary may refer to:

 Secretary of State for Energy (Spain)
 United States Secretary of Energy
 Secretary of State for Energy and Climate Change, in the United Kingdom